Philippe Nsiah (born 24 October 1994) is a French professional footballer who plays as a forward for Cypriot side Göcmenköy IYSK. In his career Nsiah also played for teams such as La Flèche, Pandurii Târgu Jiu or Daco-Getica București.

Honours
CSA Steaua București
Liga III: 2020–21

References

External links

 
 
 Philippe Nsiah at KTFF

1994 births
Living people
French footballers
Association football forwards
Paris Saint-Germain F.C. players
Racing Club de France Football players
Angers SCO players
Championnat National 2 players
USSA Vertou players
Liga I players
Liga II players
CS Pandurii Târgu Jiu players
ASC Daco-Getica București players
LPS HD Clinceni players
CS Concordia Chiajna players
CSA Steaua București footballers
Anagennisi Deryneia FC players
V.League 1 players
SHB Da Nang FC players
French expatriate footballers
French expatriate sportspeople in Romania
Expatriate footballers in Romania
French expatriate sportspeople in Vietnam
Expatriate footballers in Vietnam
French expatriate sportspeople in Cyprus
Expatriate footballers in Cyprus